Kitchener is one of the seven train lines of the GO Transit system in the Greater Toronto Area, Ontario, Canada. It extends westward from Union Station in Toronto to Kitchener, though most trains originate and terminate in Brampton in off-peak hours. A two-year pilot project which began in October 2021 extends the line west to London, Ontario.

History

Services

The GO Transit Georgetown line opened on April 29, 1974, becoming the second line in the GO Transit rail network. Peak-direction train service operated between Georgetown and Union Station, replacing a commuter service previously operated by Canadian National Railway (CN).

Service was extended beyond Georgetown to Guelph on October 29, 1990, but was again cut back to Georgetown on July 2, 1993.

Limited weekday midday service was introduced in April 2002, with four trains in each direction between Union and Bramalea.  These trains were discontinued in 2011 to facilitate construction of the Georgetown South Expansion project.

On December 19, 2011, the Georgetown Line was renamed the Kitchener Line as service was extended to Kitchener, making one intermediate stop at Guelph. Another intermediate stop, Acton, opened on January 7, 2013.

Weekday midday service was re-introduced in September 2015, with hourly service between Mount Pleasant and Union.

In September 2019, GO Transit introduced limited off-peak train service along the entire length of the line, with two new weekday round trips operating between Toronto and Kitchener outside of peak periods.

On October 18, 2021, service to London, Ontario began as a pilot project; one train per weekday in each direction runs as an extension of Kitchener line service, with intermediate stops in Stratford and St. Marys. The existing Via Rail station in each community serves as each stop.

Infrastructure
As a part of the GO Transit Rail Improvement Program, the West Toronto Diamond was grade separated. The Metrolinx Weston railway, which carries the Kitchener Line as well as Union Pearson Express and Via trains, was lowered into a trench to pass under CP's North Toronto main line.  Trains began using the new grade separation in May 2014.

The Georgetown South railway expansion project was initiated in 2009 with Metrolinx now as its proponent.  The project represented a significant increase in railway capacity, with the former one- to two-track railway being widened to 4 tracks within Toronto, with a total of 8 tracks where the Milton line and Barrie line share the corridor. All level crossings along the corridor were eliminated using railway or roadway underpasses.  The plan would allow for an increased frequency of trains on the route, increasing service from approximately 50 per day to about 300. It drew criticism from Weston community groups, which opposed the increased use of diesel locomotives on the basis of air pollution.  They  preferred instead that the corridor be electrified. The group has also requested more stations along the route.

The Georgetown South project was later reduced in scope due to cost overruns: the corridor was expanded to three tracks, with the fourth track as well as the dedicated Barrie line tracks deferred to future projects. Construction on the Weston subdivision itself finished in 2015, allowing Union Pearson Express to begin operating, while additional track work in the Union Station Rail Corridor continued into 2016.

In 2009 Metrolinx purchased  of track along the corridor from Toronto to Bramalea for $160 million.

In 2019, Metrolinx conducted a series of public forums on electrification of the Kitchener line from Georgetown to Kitchener, in a change from its earlier Regional Express Rail plan, which had called for continuation of diesel train service on the western portion of the line. Electrification plans reaffirmed overall Metrolinx goals of track bed and bridge improvements, quad-tracking sections of the line, and the addition of a station at Breslau.

Station list

Current service
GO Transit train service operates on weekdays only. During the times that trains do not operate, corresponding GO bus service is provided.

On weekdays during peak periods in the peak direction, approximately 2 trains per hour operate the full route between Toronto and Kitchener, while additional trips operate shorter segments to and from Toronto. Express trains typically serve all stations between Kitchener and Bramalea, and operate non-stop between Bramalea and Union.

Outside of peak periods, service operates hourly between Mount Pleasant and Union, of which 2 off-peak in each direction also cover the entire route from Kitchener to Toronto.

Future expansion
The 2008 proposal to extend services past Georgetown to Kitchener included some components which have not yet been realized. In addition to the now-realized stations in Kitchener, Guelph and Acton, the report proposed a station in Breslau which would serve as a park-and-ride facility for Waterloo Region. A layover yard in Baden was also proposed. The Breslau station received further approval in an official expansion plan in June 2016.

The provincial initiative known as GO Regional Express Rail proposes a substantial increase in Kitchener line service over the next decade. During peak hours, trains would run in peak direction every 30 minutes from Kitchener to Union Station and every 15 minutes from Mount Pleasant to Union Station. Electrification will be in place from Bramalea to Union Station, with trains running every 15 minutes along the electrified line throughout the day. CN Rail owns a  segment of the line between Georgetown and Bramalea that will be bypassed by a  track to which freight traffic will be shunted. Once completed, Metrolinx will acquire the track segment between Bramalea and Georgetown.

A new station is also proposed where the line crosses Eglinton Avenue in the Mount Dennis neighbourhood. It would interface with the western end of the Line 5 Eglinton LRT at Mount Dennis station, and open when that line opens in 2022.

The Region of Waterloo is planning to build Kitchener Central Station, a transit hub, at the north-east corner of King and Victoria streets in Kitchener. The hub would serve GO Transit trains and buses as well as other local and intercity public transit services.

As part of Toronto mayor John Tory's Smart Track initiative, new stations are planned where the line crosses St. Clair Avenue West and near Liberty Village.

, Metrolinx is considering replacing its Etobicoke North GO Station with a proposed Highway 27–Woodbine station about 2 kilometres west, near Woodbine Racetrack. Metrolinx wants to demolish Etobicoke North station site to effect service improvements.

In February 2020, Metrolinx held a series of Public Information Centres detailing plans for expansion on the line. During peak hours, the plan calls for hourly peak direction service from Kitchener and 30 minute service from Georgetown. Both of these will run express from Bramalea, with trains from Kitchener making a stop at Weston. The plan also calls for full 10 minute bi-directional service from Bramalea and hourly off-peak services running express from Bramalea to Union Station, with weekday trains stopping at Bramption and Mount Pleasant.

On April 30, 2021, the Ontario Ministry of Transportation and Metrolinx released a preliminary business case for mid-term infrastructure improvements which would permit more frequent Kitchener line service, as well as a Request for Qualifications for smaller, short-term infrastructure improvement projects on the line. The business case, dated to March 2021, estimated a reduction of GO train travel times from Kitchener to Toronto's Union Station from 111 minutes to 98 minutes with infrastructure improvements which would lift existing slow orders on the line due to poor infrastructure repair. With grade separation of Silver Junction near Georgetown, there would be a further reduction to 90 minutes, along with improved reliability due to the elimination of the need for a train meet at Georgetown, as well as the mitigation of potential conflicts with freight operations. Metrolinx estimated that ridership on the line with full improvements would be 11,008,500 per year, compared to 7,035,100 per year with no improvements ("business as usual"); the vast majority of the increased ridership would be attributable to the instituting of all-day, two-way service. In May 2022, Metrolinx announced that the construction contract was awarded to Dagmar Construction Inc. The work would include:
 a second platform at Guelph Central GO Station
 an extension of the north platform at Guelph Central GO Station
 a new storage track for maintenance vehicles west of Guelph
 a new passing track at Acton GO Station
 a new storage track for maintenance vehicles near Rockwood
 track re-alignments between Kitchener and Georgetown

See also

 Halton Subdivision – Canadian National rail line between Brampton and Georgetown partially used by Kitchener line trains
 Quebec City–Windsor Corridor (Via Rail) – larger trans-provincial rail corridor which includes the Kitchener line route
 Rail transport in Ontario

References

External links

 Kitchener Line: Train and Bus Schedule on GO Transit updated January 5, 2019
 GO Transit's Kitchener Line on Transit Toronto
 

GO Transit
Passenger rail transport in Toronto
Passenger rail transport in Mississauga
Passenger rail transport in Brampton
Passenger rail transport in Guelph
Passenger rail transport in Kitchener, Ontario
Rail infrastructure in Perth County, Ontario
Passenger rail transport in London, Ontario
Passenger rail transport in the Regional Municipality of Halton
Rail transport in Wellington County, Ontario
Railway lines opened in 1974
1974 establishments in Ontario